Momchil Karailiev (born 21 May 1982) is a Bulgarian triple jumper. He represented his country at the 2004 and 2008 Olympic Games as well as three outdoor and four indoor World Championships.

His personal best jump is 17.41 metres, achieved in June 2009 in Sofia.

International competitions

External links

1982 births
Living people
Bulgarian male triple jumpers
Athletes (track and field) at the 2004 Summer Olympics
Athletes (track and field) at the 2008 Summer Olympics
Olympic athletes of Bulgaria
20th-century Bulgarian people
21st-century Bulgarian people